New Territories East Cluster is one of the seven hospital clusters managed by Hospital Authority in Hong Kong. It consists of seven public hospitals and ten general outpatient clinics to provide public healthcare services for the population of Sha Tin, Tai Po, North District, and part of the Sai Kung District. In mid-2019, the population was 1,320,300. The current Cluster Chief Executive is Dr Beatrice Cheng.

Services
New Territories East Cluster operates the following seven hospitals of various capabilities to provide a range of acute, convalescent, rehabilitation, infirmary inpatient, and ambulatory care services to the public in the areas of Sha Tin, Tai Po, North District, and part of the Sai Kung District. In mid-2019, the population of the areas was 1,320,300.

Alice Ho Miu Ling Nethersole Hospital
Bradbury Hospice
Cheshire Home, Shatin
North District Hospital
Prince of Wales Hospital
Shatin Hospital
Tai Po Hospital

, the cluster has 4,927 in-patient beds and 13,061 full-time equivalent staff.

Finance
The cluster is primarily funded by the Hong Kong Government subvention allocated by the Hospital Authority. For the year ended 31 March 2020, the cluster received HK$10.69 billion of recurrent government subvention. The total expenditure was HK$12.28 billion.

References

External links

Hospital Authority
2001 establishments in Hong Kong